George Lindsay "Billy" Wilson (27 April 1868 – 9 March 1920) was an Australian first-class cricketer active from 1886 to 1899 who played for Sussex and Victoria. He appeared in 75 first-class matches as a right-handed batsman who bowled right arm fast medium. He scored 2,605 runs with a highest score of 174 among three centuries and took 34 wickets with a best performance of four for 47.

References

1868 births
1920 deaths
Australian cricketers
Sussex cricketers
Victoria cricketers
Oxford University cricketers
Marylebone Cricket Club cricketers
Gentlemen of England cricketers
Melbourne Cricket Club cricketers
Oxford and Cambridge Universities cricketers
Alumni of Hertford College, Oxford
People from Fitzroy, Victoria
Cricketers from Melbourne